NACRA may refer to:

Nacra Sailing, brand name for a line of small catamaran sailboats
North America Caribbean Rugby Association, the former name of Rugby Americas North from 2001 through 2016